Headstones is the second studio album by the gothic metal band Lake of Tears. Released in 1995, the album showed the band abandoning the death/doom of the previous work in favor of "a mixture of Gothic, Doom, Acoustic and Melancholy."

Track listing

Personnel
Johan Oudhuis - drums
Mikael Larsson - bass
Jonas Eriksson - guitars
Daniel Brennare - vocals, guitars

Additional personnel
Annica Karlsson - female vocals
Mikael Hult - acoustic guitar on "Headstones"
Ulf Petterson - keyboards, producer, recording, mixing
Kristian Wåhlin - cover art
Anton Hedberg - photography
Börje Forsberg - producer

References

External links
 Lake of Tears's official website

1995 albums
Lake of Tears albums